Young Summer (Swedish: Ung sommar) is a 1954 Swedish drama film directed by Kenne Fant and starring Edvin Adolphson, Lennart Lindberg and Dagmar Ebbesen. The film's sets were designed by the art director Bibi Lindström.

Cast
 Birgitta Lundin as 	Marianne 
 Edvin Adolphson as 	Albert Lysvik
 Lennart Lindberg as 	Helge Lysvik
 Gunnar Olsson as 	Cantor
 Dagmar Ebbesen as 	Hedvig Lysvik
 Åke Claesson as 	Christian Carlström
 Nils Hallberg as 	Janne
 Marianne Löfgren as 	Helga's landlady
 John Norrman as 	Nils
 Gunvor Pontén as 	Elly Carlström
 Börje Mellvig as 	Sture Wärn, pianist
 Wiktor Andersson as 	Janitor 
 Bengt Blomgren as 	Stellan
 Ragnar Arvedson as 	Older gentleman at Carlström's party	
 Elsa Ebbesen as Postmistress
 Helga Brofeldt as 	Lysvik's neighbour
 Kristina Adolphson as 	Girl at the debutant's ball 
 Harry Ahlin as 	Mayor 
 Lena Bergqvist as 	Little girl on the bus 
 Magnus Kesster as 	Pianist 
 Mona Malm as 	Girl at the debutant's ball 
 Curt Masreliez as 	King in Helge's story 
 Hanny Schedin as 	Marianne's mother
 Tage Severin as 	Dancing student 
 Sonja Westerbergh as 	Barbro, singer at the ball
 Catrin Westerlund as 	Girl at the gas station

References

Bibliography 
 Qvist, Per Olov & von Bagh, Peter. Guide to the Cinema of Sweden and Finland. Greenwood Publishing Group, 2000.

External links 
 

1954 films
Swedish drama films
1954 drama films
1950s Swedish-language films
Films directed by Kenne Fant
1950s Swedish films